Xstream Pictures is a Chinese production company, based out of Beijing and Hong Kong.

Company Founders
It was founded by filmmakers Jia Zhangke, Chow Keung, and Yu Lik-wai.

Company History
Formed in 2003, the company's first production was Jia's own The World.

It has since served as a production house for several of Jia's other films, as well as Yu Lik-wai's Plastic City.

List of productions 

 2004 - The World (dir. Jia Zhangke)
 2006 - Walking on the Wild Side (dir. Han Jie)
 2006 - Still Life (dir. Jia Zhangke)
 2006 - Dong (dir. Jia Zhangke)
 2007 - Useless (dir. Jia Zhangke)
 2008 - Plastic City (dir. Yu Lik-wai)
 2008 - 24 City (dir. Jia Zhangke)
 2008 - Perfect Life (dir. Emily Tang)
 2013 - Forgetting to Know You (dir. Quan Ling)
 2015 - Mountains May Depart (dir. Jia Zhangke)
 200x - Age of Tattoo (dir. Jia Zhangke) (in production)

References 

Film production companies of China
Mass media companies established in 2003
Film production companies of Hong Kong
Chinese companies established in 2003
2003 establishments in Hong Kong
Companies based in Beijing